Citizen diplomacy (people's diplomacy) is the political concept of average citizens engaging as representatives of a country or cause either inadvertently or by design. Citizen diplomacy may take place when official channels are not reliable or desirable; for instance, if two countries do not formally recognize each other's governments, citizen diplomacy may be an ideal tool of statecraft. Citizen diplomacy does not have to be direct negotiations between two parties, but can take the form of: scientific exchanges, cultural exchanges, and international athletic events.

Citizen diplomacy can complement official diplomacy or subvert it. Some nations ban track-two efforts like this when they run counter to official foreign policy.

Citizen Diplomacy is the concept that the individual has the right, even the responsibility, to help shape U.S. foreign relations, "one handshake at a time." Citizen diplomats can be students, teachers, athletes, artists, business people, humanitarians, adventurers or tourists. They are motivated by a responsibility to engage with the rest of the world in a meaningful, mutually beneficial dialogue.

One of the pioneers of citizen diplomacy, physicist Robert W. Fuller, traveled frequently to the Soviet Union in the 1970s and 1980s in the effort to alleviate the Cold War. After the collapse of the Soviet Union, Fuller continued this work in political hot spots around the world and developed the idea of reducing rankism to promote peace. The phrase "citizen diplomacy" was first coined by David M. Hoffman in an article about Fuller's work which appeared in Co-Evolution Quarterly in 1981.  Anti-nuclear groups like Clamshell Alliance and ECOLOGIA have sought to thwart US policy through "grassroots" initiatives with Soviet and (later) former Soviet groups.

See also
Center for Citizen Initiatives
Public diplomacy
Facebook diplomacy
Global Ties U.S.
Sister Cities International
People to People International
Track II diplomacy
World Affairs Councils of America
Koyamada International Foundation

References

Further reading 
Attias, Shay. (2013). Israel's new peer to peer diplomacy. The Hague Journal of Diplomacy, 7(4), 473–482.
Gelder, Melinda. Meeting the Enemy, Becoming a Friend. Bauu Institute: Dec 2006. 
Gopin, Marc. To Make the Earth Whole: The Art of Citizen Diplomacy in an Age of Religious Militancy. Rowman & Littlefield: June 2009. 
Mattern, Douglass. Looking for Square Two: Moving from War and Organized Violence to Global Community. Millennial Mind Pub: June 2006. 
Patterson, David S. The Search for Negotiated Peace: Women's Activism and Citizen Diplomacy in World War I. Routledge: Dec 2007. 
Phillips, David L. Unsilencing the Past: Track two Diplomacy And Turkish-Armenian Reconciliation. Berghahn Books: Feb 2005.

External links
Business for Diplomatic Action
U.S. Center for Citizen Diplomacy
World Citizens guide

Types of diplomacy
Political concepts
Activism by type
Citizenship